"Scary Monsters (And Super Creeps)" is a song by English singer-songwriter David Bowie, released as the title track of his 1980 album Scary Monsters (and Super Creeps). It was also issued as the third single from that album in January 1981. Coming as it did in the wake of two earlier singles from Scary Monsters, "Ashes to Ashes" in August 1980 and "Fashion" in October the same year, NME critics Roy Carr and Charles Shaar Murray labelled its release another instance "in the fine old tradition of milking albums for as much as they could possibly be worth". The song was subsequently performed on a number of Bowie tours.

Musically the track was notable for its lead guitar work by Robert Fripp and distinctive synthesized percussion. The lyrics, sung by Bowie in his Cockney accent, charted a woman's withdrawal from the world and descent into madness ("When I looked in her eyes they were blue but nobody home ... Now she's stupid in the street and she can't socialise"). Thematically the song has been compared to Joy Division's "She's Lost Control" (1979), and to the "claustrophobic romance" of Iggy Pop's 1977 collaborations with Bowie, The Idiot and Lust for Life.

The edited single reached No. 20 in the UK charts. As well as 7" vinyl, it was issued in Compact Cassette format.

Track listing
All tracks written by David Bowie.
 "Scary Monsters (And Super Creeps)" – 3:27
 "Because You're Young" – 4:51

The French release of the single had "Up the Hill Backwards" as the B-side.

Personnel
According to Chris O'Leary:
 David Bowie – lead and backing vocals
 Robert Fripp – lead guitar
 Carlos Alomar – rhythm guitar
 George Murray – bass guitar
 Dennis Davis – drums
 Tony Visconti – acoustic guitar, keyboard, backing vocal

Production
 Tony Visconti
 David Bowie

Charts

Live versions
A concert performance recorded on 12 September 1983 was included on the live album Serious Moonlight (Live '83), which was part of the 2018 box set Loving the Alien (1983-1988) and was released separately the following year.  The filmed performance appears on the concert video Serious Moonlight (1984). The song was performed during the 1987 Glass Spider Tour, although a 1987 live performance of the song was not included until the 2007 special edition release of Glass Spider featured a performance recorded in Montreal, Canada. Bowie performed the song with Nine Inch Nails numerous times during the Outside Tour and one live version was released on the concert album No Trendy Réchauffé (Live Birmingham 95) (2020). Bowie performed the song on Saturday Night Live on 8 February 1997, later released on the album Saturday Night Live - 25 Years Volume 1. A July 1997 performance at the Phoenix Festival was released in 2021 on Look at the Moon! (Live Phoenix Festival 97). Bowie and Reeves Gabrels performed an all-acoustic country and western version of the song for the radio station WRXT in Chicago Il on 16 October 1997.

Other releases
 The song appeared on the following compilations:
 Golden Years (1983) – album version
 The Singles Collection (1993) – album version
 Best of Bowie (2002) – single edit
 The Platinum Collection – single edit
 The Best of David Bowie 1980/1987 (2007) – single edit
 Nothing Has Changed (2014) (3-CD version) – single edit
 The single edit of the song was also included on Re:Call 3, part of the A New Career in a New Town (1977–1982) compilation (2017).
 It also appeared on the soundtrack of the PlayStation game Gran Turismo (1998).

Covers 

The Uruguayan Gothic Rock band RRRRRRR covered the song by recording it in 2005.

References in pop culture 

 "Scary Monsters (and Super Creeps)" is heard in the back drop of the bar scene in the 1988 American science fiction action film Alien Nation (film) starring James Caan and Mandy Patinkin.
 "Scary Monsters (and Super Creeps)" was referenced in the popular multimedia franchise JoJo's Bizarre Adventure. It is the name of a Stand called "Scary Monsters" (Japanese: スケアリー・モンスターズ Hepburn: Sukearī Monsutāzu), which was introduced in Part 7: Steel Ball Run.

References

Sources 

Songs about mental health
Songs about monsters
1981 singles
David Bowie songs
1980 songs
Song recordings produced by David Bowie
Song recordings produced by Tony Visconti
Songs written by David Bowie
RCA Records singles